Almaty International Airport  is a major international airport  northeast of Almaty, the largest city and commercial capital of Kazakhstan. It is the busiest airport in Kazakhstan, accounting for 6.42 million passengers in 2019.

Owners and management
The airport is registered under name of "JSC Almaty International Airport", which is owned by Turkish airport company TAV Airports Holding, as well as many other airports available worldwide.

History

Early years 
The airport was built in 1935 for use by small civil and military aircraft. Up to 1990, it was the part of Kazakh Department of Civil Aviation, and then reorganized into "Alma-Ata Airport" in 1991. Since 1993, it has run as an independent business unit. In 1994, it was reorganized into OJSC "Almaty Airport" and later renamed to JSC Almaty International Airport.

The supersonic transport (SST) Tupolev Tu-144 began service on 26 December 1975, flying mail and freight between Moscow and Alma-Ata in preparation for passenger services, which commenced in November 1977. The Aeroflot flight on 1 June 1978 was the Tu-144's 55th and last scheduled passenger service.

Following a runway reconstruction in 1998, Almaty airport was awarded a CAT II certificate and the status of an international airport.

On 9 July 1999, a fire started in the shashlik kitchen of the airport restaurant. The terminal building burned down in just a few hours, but without major injuries.

Development since 2000 
Construction of a new terminal was completed in 2004. On 30 September 2008, a second runway was opened with the first departure being a BMI flight bound for London Heathrow. The new runway was also given an ICAO certificate for CAT III landings which will significantly reduce the number of planes diverting to nearby airfields due to low visibility, especially during the winter months. The runway is the longest in central Asia. The new runway can accept all types of aircraft without limitation of take-off weight and operation frequency.

Growth in connectivity is in danger of being compromised by airport infrastructure that is comparatively expensive and not keeping pace with demand growth. IATA is urging the Kazakhstan government to follow ICAO principles and eliminate differential ANSP charges between domestic and international carriers. Currently (2012), it is 18% more expensive to turn around an Airbus A320 in Almaty than at similarly sized airports in Europe. The differential rises to 43% for a Boeing 767.

There were plans to build a new passenger terminal for international flights with six loading bridges and capacity up to 2,500 passengers per hour in the near future. A developed infrastructure complex consisting of a Marriott Hotel, conference halls, business center, shopping center and cinemas were planned to be within this terminal.

The new terminal was to be located along Kuldja Road to help reduce traffic on the way to the airport. However the terminal's construction was stopped due to managers postponing the project's construction in 2010 because of disagreements with Air Astana's plans for the terminal which was intended to serve Air Astana international flights while the existing terminal would serve domestic destinations. According to the managers, the problems of this plan would be that Air Astana would have faculties operating, and its planes transferring from one end of the runway to another which would create delayed transporting problems for Air Astana; since the runway lines would be busy with the having lack of space of creating new runways. There has been a conclusion to demolish the construction and rebuild the new terminal used for domestic and international flights. There are now plans to build a new airport in Kapchagai reservoir which is 48 km away from Almaty.

On February 17, 2012, in Moscow, at the 32nd session of the Council on Aviation and the Use of Airspace of the Interstate Aviation Committee (IAC), Almaty International Airport was recognized as the best in the CIS and received the prize "For Achievements in the Development of International Airports".

Protesters seized the airport on 5 January during the 2022 Kazakh unrest, halting flights. Kazakh President Kassym-Jomart Tokayev said that eight members of Kazakh security forces had been killed and the insurgents had hijacked five airplanes, and he appealed to Russian security forces to retake the facility. On 7 January, TASS reported that Collective Security Treaty Organization troops had occupied the airport and restored order.

In May 2022, a proposal was made  to Deputy Prime Minister Roman Sklyar by a group of deputies from the People's Party of Kazakhstan to name the airport after Kazakh Soviet communist politician Dinmukhamed Kunaev.

Airlines and destinations

Passenger

Cargo

Statistics

Annual traffic

Accidents and incidents
 7 July 1980: Aeroflot Flight 4225, a Tupolev Tu-154B-2, aircraft registration CCCP-85355, crashed with the loss of all 156 passengers and 10 crew shortly after takeoff from Alma-Ata Airport.
 30 August 1983: Aeroflot Flight 5463, a Tupolev Tu-134, crashed on approach to Almaty after a flight from Chelyabinsk; all 90 passengers and crew died.
 29 January 2013: SCAT Airlines Flight 760, a Bombardier CRJ-200ER, crashed during a low-visibility approach into Almaty International. All 21 occupants died. Investigators found that during the missed approach necessitated by the inclement weather, the elevator was deflected to lower the nose instead of raising the nose, resulting in a steep dive and impact with the ground; they were unable to determine the cause of the elevator movement but did not find evidence of any system malfunction or external influences.
27 December 2019: Thirteen people died when Bek Air Flight 2100, a Fokker 100, crashed en route to Nursultan Nazarbayev International Airport, crashing into a building just after takeoff.
13 March 2021: An Antonov An-26 operating for the Border Service of the National Security Committee of the Republic of Kazakhstan crashed on landing; four occupants died and the two survivors reportedly suffered serious injuries. The cause of the accident is under investigation.

See also
List of airports in Kazakhstan
List of the busiest airports in the former USSR

References

External links

Airports built in the Soviet Union
Airports in Kazakhstan
Transport in Almaty
Airport International
Airports established in 1935
1935 establishments in the Soviet Union